Shani Kataev (born April 12, 2003 in Israel) is an Israeli athlete competing in group rhythmic gymnastics.

Career

Junior
In 2017, she joined Israeli junior group and competed at International Tournament Alina Cup in Moscow, where they took silver medal in Group All-around behind Russia. At the 2017 Junior European Championships in Budapest, Hungary they won silver medal in 10 Clubs final. She competed at the 2018 Junior European Championships in Guadalajara, Spain, where she placed 19th in Hoop and 16th in Ball Qualifications.

Senior
She competed at the 2019 World Cup Pesaro and ended on 33rd place in All-around.

References

External links
 
 

Israeli rhythmic gymnasts
2003 births
Living people